The World Press Photo of the Year award is part of the World Press Photo Awards, organized by the Dutch foundation World Press Photo.

Considered one of the most prestigious and coveted awards in photojournalism, the World Press Photo of the Year is awarded to the image that "... is not only the photojournalistic encapsulation of the year, but represents an issue, situation or event of great journalistic importance, and does so in a way that demonstrates an outstanding level of visual perception and creativity."

The jury, composed of 10 members, also assigns the World Press Photo Story of the Year to a multi-image story that explores a theme of social relevance distinguished by photographic intensity and importance of the content. The creators of the two main awards receive a cash prize corresponding to €5,000.

In addition to the two main prizes, 3 single photo prizes and 3 story prizes are also awarded in each of eight categories.

List of Press Photos of the Year 
The following is a list of all winners of the Press Photo of the Year, and information on the respective images.

Gallery

See also

 List of European art awards
 List of photographs considered the most important

References

External links

Timeline of all contests and World Press Photo of the Year winners

Photojournalism awards
Awards established in 1955
Dutch art awards
1955 establishments in the Netherlands
Lists of photographs